Caia District is a district of Sofala Province in Mozambique. The principal town is 
Caia. The district is located in the north of the province, and borders with Chemba District in the north, Marromeu District in the southeast, Cheringoma District in the south, and with Maringué District in the west. In the east, the district is bounded by the Indian Ocean. It has a population of 115,455 as of 2007.

Geography
The district is located at the right bank of the Zambezi, and includes a part of the Zambezi Delta.

The climate of the district is tropical semi-arid at the interior and tropical humid at the coast.

History
In the early colonial times, the area belonged to the Territory of Manica and Sofala. In 1891, the territory was split into three smaller divisions, and the area was transferred into one of them, Sena Circunscrição. In 1964, the latter was elevated to the category of Conselho, and in 1967, it was denamed into Conselho de Caia.

Demographics
As of 2005, 45% of the population of the district was younger than 15 years. 23% of the population spoke Portuguese. The most common mothertongue among the population was Cindau. 81% were analphabetic, mostly women.

Administrative divisions
The district is divided into three postos, Caia (two localities), Murraça (two localities), and Sena (two localities).

Economy
1% of the households in the district have access to electricity.

Agriculture
In the district, there are 17,000 farms which have on average  of land. The main agricultural products are corn, cassava, cowpea, peanut, sweet potato, and rice.

Transportation

There is passenger navigation on the Zambezi.

References

 
Districts in Sofala Province